Astrid Glenner-Frandsen (born 11 April 1993) is a Danish athlete. She competed in the women's 4 × 100 metres relay event at the 2019 World Athletics Championships.

References

External links

1993 births
Living people
Danish female sprinters
Place of birth missing (living people)
World Athletics Championships athletes for Denmark
European Games competitors for Denmark
Athletes (track and field) at the 2019 European Games
Athletes (track and field) at the 2020 Summer Olympics
Olympic athletes of Denmark